Little Secrets may refer to:

Film and television
 Little Secrets (TV series), a Turkish teen drama television series
 Little Secrets (2001 film), an American comedy-drama film
 Little Secrets (2006 film), a Luxembourgish film
 Little Secret (film), a 2016 Brazilian drama

Music
 "Little Secrets" (Passion Pit song), 2009
 "Little Secrets" (Professor Green song), 2014
 Little Secret, a 2014 album by Canadian singer Nikki Yanofsky

See also
Secrecy (disambiguation)
Secret (disambiguation)
Secrets (disambiguation)